In Serbian, Macedonian and in Bulgarian mythology, Black Arab (Macedonian: Црна Арапина, Crna Arapina) is a designation for Arabs and black people. The Black Arab is often depicted as a dark skin ruffian who kidnaps women and girls. In Serbian folklore, as well as in the beliefs of other Balkan peoples, the Arab is a chthonic demon, a replacement for the devil. Some authors compare it with Slavic Triglav.

In a story of Serb folklore, an Arab, after being slain in battle, escapes while carrying his head in his arm. Some other tales and folk songs have the character of a three-headed Arab.

In Bulgarian folklore, notable national heroes such as Sider Voevoda or Strahil Voevoda fight Black Arab.

In Serbian and Macedonian folklore Krali Marko fights against Black Arab.

Literature
 Interpretations, volume III, 2009: Black Arab as a Figure of Memory

References

Further reading
 Stojanović, Lidija (2011). “Arapot Vo Makedonskata Narodna kniževnost I Negovi Paraleli Na Mediteranot" [The Black Arab in Macedonian Folk Literature and Parallels in the Mediterranean Folklore]. In: Studia Mythologica Slavica 14 (October). Ljubljana, Slovenija, 195-211. https://doi.org/10.3986/sms.v14i0.1609.

Anti-Arabism in Europe
Anti-black racism in Europe
Black people in European folklore
Serbian folklore
Slavic mythology
Stereotypes of Arab people
Stereotypes of black people